The men's luge at the 2006 Winter Olympics began on February 11,  and was completed on February 12 at Cesana Pariol.

Results
The men's singles luge event was run over two days, with the first two runs on February 11, and the second two runs on February 12.  The total time was the combined time of all four runs.

References

Men
Men's events at the 2006 Winter Olympics